The superior deep cervical lymph nodes lie under the sternocleidomastoid muscle in close relation with the accessory nerve and the internal jugular vein.

Some of the glands lie in front of and others behind the vessel. Lymph from these deep nodes passes to the jugular lymphatic trunk, which joins the thoracic duct on the left side and the brachiocephalic vein on the right side.

References 

(.pdf) version: https://ia800500.us.archive.org/15/items/anatomyofhumanbo1918gray/anatomyofhumanbo1918gray.pdf

Lymphatics of the head and neck